Dancing with Tears in My Eyes is a 1997 compilation from British band Ultravox covering their output with Midge Ure, from 1980 to 1987. It was re-released in 2003 as The Best Of Ultravox with a different cover but identical tracks.

On this compilation, "Love's Great Adventure" is erroneously listed as "Love's Great Adventure (Live)" – it is the standard single version. The "(live)" label applies to the next track, "White China", which is a B-side on the "Love's Great Adventure" single.

Most of Ultravox's 1980s singles are represented, along with several rarer B-sides.

Track listing
"Sleepwalk" – 3:14 from Vienna
"Waiting" – 3:52 B-Side to Sleepwalk single
"Passing Strangers" – 3:51 from Vienna
"Vienna" – 4:39 from Vienna
"Passionate Reply" – 4:18 B-Side to Vienna single
"The Voice" – 4:25 from Rage in Eden
"Hymn" – 4:26 from Quartet
"Monument" – 3:17 from Monument
"We Came to Dance" – 4:10 from Quartet
"Dancing with Tears in My Eyes" – 4:06 from Lament
"Reap the Wild Wind" – 3:46 from Quartet
"Love's Great Adventure" – 3:08 from The Collection
"White China (Live)" – 3:47 B-Side to Love's Great Adventure single
"All Fall Down" – 5:09 from U-Vox
"Dreams?" – 2:33 B-Side to All Fall Down single
"All in One Day" – 4:20 from U-Vox

References

1997 compilation albums
EMI Records compilation albums
Ultravox compilation albums